The Pop Punk's Not Dead Tour was 
a concert tour headlined by American rock band New Found Glory. The initial US leg was sponsored by Rockstar energy drink, with the band supported by Set Your Goals, The Wonder Years, Man Overboard, and This Time Next Year. The band wanted to showcase young talent from within the pop punk scene, following in the footsteps of bands such as Less Than Jake, Blink-182 and Green Day, who had in turn helped them out by offering support roles early in their career. It was announced on 1 August 2011 that the tour would commence on 6 October in Santa Cruz, California, running through 20 November in San Diego following the release of the band's seventh studio album Radiosurgery. AbsolutePunk ran an exclusive competition on their website, with five pairs of free tickets available for the tour including a meet-and-greet with the band back stage. During the band's stint on the 2012 Kerrang! Tour, it was announced they would be bringing the tour to UK shores later in the year.

Support acts

United States
Set Your Goals
The Wonder Years
Man Overboard
This Time Next Year

United Kingdom
 The Story So Far
 Candy Hearts
 Only Rivals
 State Champs

Dates
The Pop Punks Not Dead Tour has thus far featured 37 tour stops in the United States.

See also

List of punk rock festivals

References

External links

2011 concert tours
Rock festivals in the United States
Rock festivals in the United Kingdom
Punk rock festivals
Music festivals established in 2011